The Russian occupation of Kyiv Oblast was a military occupation that began on the first day of the Russian Invasion of Ukraine; 24 February 2022. The capital, Kyiv was never captured during the invasion and was extensively bombed. However, many cities were captured near North and western parts of the Oblast.

Occupation

Arrival of Russian forces 

On 24 February 2022, Russian forces began invading Ukraine with their main target being the capital, Kyiv. Russian forces entered Kyiv Oblast and quickly captured Chernobyl and Pripyat, in the Chernobyl Exclusion Zone.

By 26 February 2022, Russian forces captured Hostomel, Borodianka, Vorzel and Bucha, and fought a gruesome battle for Antonov airport, which resulted in Russian victory.

Kyiv 

On the morning of 25 February, three Russian saboteurs, dressed as Ukrainian soldiers, entered Obolon District, 10 kilometres (6 mi) north of the Verkhovna Rada building, the seat of the parliament of Ukraine.

On 27 February, clashes between Ukrainian forces and Russian saboteurs continued. Meanwhile, local officials remained adamant that the city was still under full Ukrainian control.

On February 28, a fresh wave of Russian troops advanced towards Kyiv, but little direct combat occurred, with only three missiles were fired at the city that day. Satellite images revealed the existence of a long column of Russian vehicles heading to Kyiv along a 64-kilometre-long (40 mi) highway approaching Kyiv from the north, and was approximately 39 km (24 mi) from the center of Kyiv.

On the morning of 1 March, the Russian Ministry of Defense issued an evacuation notice to local civilians that they intended to target Ukrainian transmission facilities around Kyiv and that all nearby residents should leave the area. Hours later, a Russian missile struck the Kyiv TV Tower, killing five people and injuring five others. Vitaly Klitschko, mayor of Kyiv, banned the sales of alcohol in Kyiv while appealing to shop owners and pharmacy chains not to “take advantage” of the situation by raising the prices of "food, essential goods and medicines".

On 22 March, Ukrainian forces launched a counter-offensive to drive the Russians away from the city. Ukrainian forces evacuated thousands of people from nearby suburbs and settlements, including 20,000 people in Boryspil alone, and took back surrounding villages and towns.

Brovary and Lukyanivka 
On 10 March, Russian armored vehicles were seen heading towards Brovary, shortly after capturing the town of Lukyanivka.

On 28 March, Ukrainian forces recaptured Lukyanivka and pushed Russian forces out of Brovary. In Lukyanivka, most houses were destroyed and damaged Russian tanks were left on the streets.

On 29 March, Russia started to shell the Brovary area. A warehouse was set ablaze and nearby villages sustained heavy damage.

Ukrainian Counteroffensive 
On 28 March, Ukrainian forces won the battle of Irpin, and started recapturing many settlements.

By 2 April, the Ukrainian military recaptured all of Kyiv Oblast, ending the occupation.

Aftermath

Demining Operations 
Russian troops scattered mines across areas from where they withdrew and demining operations began, with the United States planning to provide $89,000,000 for demining in Kyiv, Chernihiv, Zhytomyr and Sumy Oblasts.

On 8 May, Yuliya Tymoshenko, people's deputy of Ukraine, announced that demining operations were complete in Kyiv Oblast.

Chernobyl Nuclear Power Plant 
In Chernobyl, Russian soldiers stole dangerous radioactive dust and substances from the nuclear power plant's laboratory.

War Crimes

Borodianka 
Russian forces extensively bombed Borodianka, a town near Kyiv. Soldiers used cluster munitions to fire at residential building during the night. They also left mines in civilian areas.

Bucha 
When Bucha was under Russian occupation, Russian soldiers raped, tied up and killed civilians in Bucha and left them to die on the streets. When Russian forces withdrew, they left countless tanks in destroyed civilian homes and left the dead bodies lying throughout the town, as well as mines.

Irpin 
On 6 March 2022, Russian forces shelled an intersection where residents of Irpin were fleeing to Kyiv, resulting in 8 deaths.

Control of cities

See also 
 Russian-occupied territories of Ukraine
 Russian occupation of Crimea
 Russian occupation of Chernihiv Oblast
 Russian occupation of Donetsk Oblast
 Russian occupation of Kharkiv Oblast
 Russian occupation of Kherson Oblast
 Russian occupation of Luhansk Oblast
 Russian occupation of Mykolaiv Oblast
 Russian occupation of Sumy Oblast
 Russian occupation of Zaporizhzhia Oblast
 Russian occupation of Zhytomyr Oblast
 Snake Island during the 2022 Russian invasion of Ukraine
 Annexation of Crimea by the Russian Federation
 Russian annexation of Donetsk, Kherson, Luhansk and Zaporizhzhia oblasts

Notes

References

Kyiv
February 2022 events in Ukraine
March 2022 events in Ukraine
April 2022 events in Ukraine
Kyiv offensive (2022)
History of Kyiv Oblast
History of Kyiv
Kyiv Oblast
Kyiv